Yaakov Dori (October 8, 1899 – January 22, 1973), born Yaakov Dostrovsky, was the first Chief of Staff of the Israel Defense Forces (IDF). He was also the President of the Technion – Israel Institute of Technology.

Biography

Yaakov Dostrovsky (later Dori) was born in Odessa in present-day Ukraine (then part of the Russian Empire) to Tzvi and Myriam Dostrovsky. The family immigrated to Ottoman Palestine following the anti-Jewish pogrom in Odessa in 1905. Upon completing high school at the Hebrew Reali School in Haifa, he enlisted in the Jewish Legion of the British Army during World War I. Following the war he studied engineering at the University of Ghent.

His son, Yerachmiel Dori, served as commander of the IDF's Engineering Corps. His daughter, Etana Padan, is a biochemist and a professor of microbial ecology at the Hebrew University of Jerusalem. His youngest son, Zvi Dori, was a Chemistry Professor at the Technion and the founder of the first Israeli Science Museum (Technoda). Israel Dostrovsky, physical chemistry and former President of the Weizmann Institute of Science, was his first cousin.

Military career

When he returned to Palestine in 1926, he joined the Haganah and adopted the underground name of "Dan". In the Haganah, he was the commander of the Haganah Forces of Haifa.

In 1939, Dori was appointed Chief of Staff of the Haganah, a position he held until 1946. As CoS Haganah it was Yaakov Dori's duty to take the Haganah from a diffuse self-defense organisation to a model army. From 1946-47 he also headed the Palestinian Jewish delegation sent to purchase arms in the United States.

When the IDF was formed, Dori took over as its first Chief of Staff. Yet, despite his good command and organizational skills, he was already suffering from failing health and had difficulty commanding his troops during the 1948 Palestine War, so he was forced to rely heavily on his deputy, Yigael Yadin. He completed his term as Chief of Staff on November 9, 1949, and retired from the military. He was succeeded by his deputy, Yadin. After his release from the army, however, he continued to wear the officer's pin he was awarded when he first became a second lieutenant.

Academic career
Upon leaving the IDF, Dori was appointed chairman of the nation's Science Council, attached to the Prime Minister's office. He was later appointed president of the Technion – Israel Institute of Technology in Haifa in 1951, a position he held until 1965. He followed Shlomo Kaplansky, and was followed by Alexander Goldberg.

Legacy and commemoration
The Israel Defense Forces base at Tel HaShomer, one of the largest in Israel, is named after Ya'akov Dori. A prominent road in Haifa  and a street in Beersheba are both named after him.

References

External links
Yaakov Dori's biography, IDF Spokespersons Unit (Hebrew)
Pintov-Dori Family page

1899 births
1973 deaths
Royal Fusiliers soldiers
Odesa Jews
Technion – Israel Institute of Technology presidents
Ukrainian emigrants to Israel
Israeli people of the 1948 Arab–Israeli War
Jewish Legion